Bombus barbutellus, or Barbut's cuckoo-bee, is a species of cuckoo bumblebee, widespread, if not especially common, in most of Europe.

Description 
The collar and the top of the head are yellow, the scutellum has yellow hairs (especially visible on the male bumblebee), and the first tergite (abdominal segment) is usually more or less yellow. The tail is whitish; the last tergite of the male, however, has intermixed black hairs. The rest of the fur, which is quite short (especially on old queens after hibernation), is black.

Ecology 
As a cuckoo bumblebee, B. barbutellus does not build any nest of its own, but usurps the nests of other bumblebees, killing the queen and forcing the workers to raise its own offspring. The main hosts are B. hortorum, B. ruderatus, and B. argillaceus.

Favourite food sources are flowering plants such as thistles; the queen also visits white deadnettle and vetches, while the male feeds on bramble, knapweed, lavender, and honeysuckles.

Distribution 
Bombus barbutellus is widely distributed, if not particularly common, in most of Europe from the middle of Fennoscandia in the north to southern Spain, and from the British Isles in the west to easternmost Russia. In Britain, its major distribution is in southern England, East Anglia, and western Wales.

See also
Bumblebee
List of bumblebee species
 Southern plains bumblebee, Bombus fraternus
 New garden bumblebee, Bombus hypnorum
 Orange-belted bumblebee, Bombus ternarius
 Early bumblebee, Bombus pratorum
 Buff-tailed bumblebee or large earth bumblebee, Bombus terrestris
Eusociality

References 

Bumblebees
Insects described in 1802
Hymenoptera of Europe
Taxa named by William Kirby (entomologist)